The 2001 Campionati Internazionali di Sicilia was a men's tennis tournament played on outdoor clay courts in Palermo, Italy that was part of the International Series of the 2001 ATP Tour. It was the 23rd edition of the tournament and ran from 24 September until 30 September 2001. Unseeded Félix Mantilla won the singles title.

Finals

Singles

 Félix Mantilla defeated  David Nalbandian 7–6(7–2), 6–4
 It was Mantilla's only title of the year and the 9th of his career.

Doubles

 Tomás Carbonell /  Daniel Orsanic defeated  Enzo Artoni /  Emilio Benfele Álvarez 6–2, 2–6, 6–2
 It was Carbonell's 3rd title of the year and the 24th of his career. It was Orsanic's only title of the year and the 8th of his career.

References

External links
 ITF tournament edition details

Campionati Internazionali di Sicilia
Campionati Internazionali di Sicilia
Campionati Internazionali di Sicilia
Campionati Internazionali di Sicilia